Japoteurs (1942) is the tenth of seventeen animated Technicolor short films based upon the DC Comics character of Superman, originally created by Jerry Siegel and Joe Shuster. The first Superman cartoon produced by Famous Studios (the successor to Fleischer Studios), Japoteurs covers Superman's adventures stopping Japanese spies from hijacking a bomber plane and bringing it to Tokyo. This cartoon does not bear the Famous Studios name because that company had not yet been fully organized after Max Fleischer was removed by Paramount Pictures from the studio which bore his name. The cartoon was originally released to theaters by Paramount Pictures on September 18, 1942. Japoteurs was the first Famous Studios cartoon filmed in color.

The word "Japoteur" is a portmanteau of the word "Japanese" and the word "saboteur".

Plot
The story begins with a shot of the front page of the Daily Planet. The headline reads "World's Largest Bombing Plane Finally Completed". The man reading the newspaper is Japanese, he stands up and looks at a picture of the Statue of Liberty in his office, then pushes a button on his desk, and the picture changes into one of the Japanese flag. He bows to it and jams his glowing cigarette into the news headline. Later, the Japanese man and some acquaintances hit a guard as the plane is being loaded for a test run. Clark Kent and Lois Lane are taking a tour of the new bombing plane for the Planet. When everyone is told to get off, Lois stays behind and hides in a locker on board the plane.

As the plane takes off, we see that there are other stowaways aboard. Hidden inside what look like bombs are the Japanese men. The spies tie and gag the pilots and hijack the plane. Meanwhile, Lois emerges from her hiding place and moves over to the cockpit. As she's about to open the door, she notices that the Japanese spies have hijacked the plane. She sneaks into the room and calls for help on the radio, but the spies seize her. In response to her calls for help, fighter planes are sent to stop the hijackers. In response, the hijackers deploy a bomb, which stops the fighters from taking off. Clark Kent goes into an elevator and changes into Superman as it goes up to the roof.

Superman enters the plane to stop the hijackers, but one of them has Lois tied up and is ready to drop her out of the plane through the bomb hatch. Superman jumps out of the plane and comes back in through the bomb hatch to save Lois as she's being dropped. He unties her and starts fighting the hijackers. One of them breaks the plane's controls, and the plane starts falling towards the city. Superman takes Lois out of the plane and places her on the ground, then flies back up and catches the plane, bringing it to a safe landing right in the middle of the street.

Influences
The cartoon, and the stereotypical Japanese characters in particular, are done in a style typical of American propaganda during World War II. Many cartoons of the time followed a similar vein, such as the Schlesinger/Warner Bros. cartoons Scrap Happy Daffy (1943), Daffy - The Commando (1943), and Herr Meets Hare (1945). Such films typically show Japanese and German characters in a negative light as the American hero makes short work of them.

The plane catching scene at the end is strikingly similar to a scene in Superman Returns (2006), in which Superman (Brandon Routh) stops an airplane from crashing into a baseball stadium (that resembles former Yankee Stadium) by pressing his weight into the nose and carefully lowering it onto the field.

The Arrowverse version of Supergirl’s pilot also brings homage to this scene when Kara lands the plane containing her sister on the river, after one of its engines catches fire.

Voice cast
 Bud Collyer as Clark Kent / Superman
 Joan Alexander as Lois Lane
 Jackson Beck as the Narrator
 Jack Mercer as the Press Tour Guide, Japanese Hijacker

See also
 List of World War II short films

References

External links
 
 
 

1942 short films
1942 animated films
1940s American animated films
1940s animated short films
Superman animated shorts
American aviation films
Animated films set in Tokyo
American World War II propaganda shorts
Fleischer Studios short films
American black-and-white films
Paramount Pictures short films
Japan in non-Japanese culture
Stereotypes of East Asian people
Film controversies
Race-related controversies in animation
Race-related controversies in film
American animated short films
1940s superhero films
American superhero films
1940s English-language films